Barboides britzi is a species of ray-finned fish in the carp and minnow family, Cyprinidae which occurs only in the permanently flooded Lokoli swamp forest in the basin of the Ouémé River in southern Benin.

Footnotes 

 

Barboides
Fish described in 2006
Endemic fauna of Benin